Tecoh Municipality is one of 106 municipalities in Yucatán State, Mexico, located 40 km south-east of Mérida, Yucatán. It has a municipal capital of the same name. As of 2003, the city Tecoh had a population of about 8,500 people. Most of the population is Maya. A number of buildings in the town were built atop older Pre-Columbian foundations. "Tecoh" means "Place of the Puma" in the Yucatec Maya language, which is still widely spoken here.

Most of the farms in Tecoh are used to grow henequen, sugar, corn, and tropical fruit.

Communities

The municipality is made up of 20 communities, of which the most important are:

 Tecoh (Municipal Seat)
 Xcanchakan
 Telchaquillo
 Lepan
 Pixya

Landmarks
 Cenote Nayah

Architectural

A church erected in honor of the Virgin de la Candelaria, a chapel in honor of the Santa Cruz  and a church dedicated to the Virgin de la Asunción; all built since colonial times.
 Hacienda Itzincab Cámara
 Hacienda Oxtapacab
 Hacienda Sotuta de Peón
 Hacienda Xcanchakán

Archaeological
The archaeological site of Mayapan.

Famous persons 
 Manuel Lorenzo Justiniano de Zavala y Sanchez (Known in Texas as Lorenzo de Zavala)

External links
 Tecoh on colonial-mexico.com

References

Municipalities of Yucatán